Eremberga leuconips is a species of snout moth in the genus Eremberga. It was described by Harrison Gray Dyar Jr. in 1925 and is found in the US states of Arizona and California.

The wingspan is 27–37 mm for males and 26–37 mm for females. The palpi, head, thorax and forewings are grayish fuscous densely sprinkled with white, giving it a pale slate color.

The larvae feed on Echinocereus polyacanthus.

References

Moths described in 1925
Phycitini